Sonnleithner is a surname. Notable people with the surname include:

 A family of lawyers from Vienna which is closely connected to the world of theater and music. Three of its members are of particular interest to biographers.
 Christoph Sonnleithner (1734–1786), Austrian jurist and composer.
 Joseph Sonnleithner (1766–1835), Austrian librettist, theater director, lawyer and archivist.
 Ignaz von Sonnleithner (1770–1831), Austrian jurist, writer and educator.
 Leopold von Sonnleithner (1797–1873), Austrian lawyer and composer.
 Franz von Sonnleithner (1905–1981), Austrian lawyer and diplomat.